Neville Lakay (27 October 1938 – 2 November 2015) was a South African cricketer. He played one first-class match for Western Province in 1971/72.

References

External links
 

1938 births
2015 deaths
South African cricketers
Western Province cricketers
Cricketers from Cape Town